Cast No Shadow may refer to:

 "Cast No Shadow" (song), a song by Oasis
 Cast No Shadow (film), a 2014 Canadian drama film
 "Cast No Shadow", a song by Duncan Browne (different from the Oasis song)